Curtis Blaine Wright (born June 6, 1955) is an American country music artist. He first recorded in the 1980s as a member of the Super Grit Cowboy Band before becoming a solo artist in the late 1980s and early 1990s. Wright charted three singles on Billboard Hot Country Songs between 1990 and 1993. He has also recorded as a member of Orrall & Wright, Shenandoah, and Pure Prairie League. In addition to these, Wright holds several credits as a songwriter, including the number one singles "A Woman in Love" by Ronnie Milsap, "Next to You, Next to Me" by Shenandoah, and "What's It to You" by Clay Walker.

Biography

Curtis Blaine Wright was born June 6, 1955 in Huntingdon, Pennsylvania.

Initially a member of a band known as the Country Generation, succeeded by the Super Grit Cowboy Band, Wright later performed as a backup vocalist and guitarist for Vern Gosdin. In December 1989, he quit Gosdin's band and wrote Ronnie Milsap's number one single "A Woman in Love". Wright signed with Airborne Records in 1989 and released "She's Got a Man on Her Mind", which charted at number 38 on Hot Country Songs. (A version of the same song by Conway Twitty charted one year later.) Wright was also slated to release an album titled Slick Hick in March 1990, which would have been produced by himself and Jeff Carlton. However, the album went unreleased due to financial issues with the label.

Later in the same year, he co-wrote Shenandoah's "Next to You, Next to Me" with Robert Ellis Orrall, and Steve Wariner's top 20 hit "There for Awhile". In 1992, Wright signed to Liberty Records, where he released his self-titled debut album that year. This album produced two more low-charting singles. It also included the song "What's It to You", which Wright also co-wrote with Orrall. Although Wright's version was never released as a single, Clay Walker later recorded this song on his 1993 debut album, and his version was a number one hit that year. He also co-wrote Shenandoah's 1992 single "Rock My Baby". Also in 1992, Wright co-wrote a song with fellow country singer Dennis Robbins and musician Warren Haynes which would become the title track of Robbins first Giant Records album called "Man With A Plan", for which Wright also provided backing vocals. By 1994, Wright joined Orrall to form Orrall & Wright, a duo which charted two singles, recorded one album for Giant Records and received a Duo of the Year nomination from the Country Music Association before disbanding. Wright later wrote Daryle Singletary's 1996 single "Too Much Fun".

After the departure of their former lead singer Brent Lamb (who, in turn, replaced Marty Raybon) in the late 1990s, Shenandoah chose Wright as their third lead singer. Wright left Shenandoah in 2007 to join Reba McEntire's band and Jimmy Yeary succeeded him. He also toured as a member of Pure Prairie League in the beginning of the 21st century.

Discography

Curtis Wright (1992)

Track listing

Personnel
Compiled from liner notes.

Mike Baker – acoustic guitar
Bill Cook – bass guitar
Larry Franklin – fiddle
Sonny Garrish – steel guitar
Steve Gibson – electric guitar
Vince Gill – background vocals
Rob Hajacos – fiddle
Jana King – background vocals
Chris Leuzinger – electric guitar
Randy McCormick – piano
Roger McVay – bass guitar
Tony Piro – drums
Gary Prim – piano
Brent Rowan – electric guitar, acoustic guitar
Curt Ryle – acoustic guitar, steel guitar
James Stroud – drums
Curtis Wright – vocals, acoustic guitar
Curtis Young – background vocals

Technical
Julian King – recording
Glenn Meadows – mastering
Lynn Peterzell – production, recording, mixing
James Stroud – production

Singles

Music videos

Chart Singles written by Curtis Wright

The following is a list of Curtis Wright compositions that were chart hits.

References

1955 births
Living people
People from Huntingdon, Pennsylvania
American male singer-songwriters
American country singer-songwriters
Liberty Records artists
Country musicians from Pennsylvania
American country guitarists
American male guitarists
Shenandoah (band) members
20th-century American singers
21st-century American singers
20th-century American guitarists
21st-century American guitarists
Singer-songwriters from Pennsylvania
Guitarists from Pennsylvania
20th-century American male singers
21st-century American male singers
Pure Prairie League members